Stahmer is a German surname.  Notable people with the surname include:

Edgar Stahmer (1911–1996), German music educator
Heinrich Georg Stahmer (1892–1978), German diplomat
Klaus Hinrich Stahmer (1941), German composer and musicologist
Ingrid Stahmer, German politician

See also
Stamer
Sthamer
Starmer (surname)
Stammer (disambiguation)

German-language surnames